The Autódromo Internacional de Turagua Pancho Pepe Cróquer is a motor-racing venue in Venezuela, near Maracay. It was founded in 1972, and has a permanent closed circuit as well as a dragstrip. The circuit was named after Francisco José Cróquer, a distinguished sportscaster and racing driver who was popularly known as Pancho Pepe Cróquer.

Sources

Turagua rFactor
Wikimapia
YouTube

Buildings and structures in Aragua
Motorsport venues in Venezuela
Maracay